The Gibberichthyidae, also known as gibberfishes, are a small family of deep sea stephanoberyciform fish, containing a single genus, Gibberichthys (from the Latin gibba, "humpbacked" and the Greek ichthys, "fish"), and two species. Found in the tropical western Atlantic, western Indian, and western and southwestern Pacific Oceans at depths of about 400-1,000 m, gibberfishes are of no economic importance. The maximum recorded size for either species is  standard length.

Species
There are currently two recognized species in this genus:
 Gibberichthys latifrons (Thorp, 1969)
 Gibberichthys pumilus A. E. Parr, 1933 (Gibberfish) (formerly known as Kasidoron edom Robins & De Sylva, 1965)

See also
List of fish families

References

Other sources

Stephanoberyciformes